Veronica americana, variously called American brooklime or American speedwell, is a plant native to temperate and arctic Asia and North America where it grows in streams and bottomlands.

It is a herbaceous perennial with glabrous stems 10–100 cm long that bear terminal or axillary racemes or spikes of soft violet flowers. The leaves are 1.5–8 cm long and 3 to 20 times as long as wide, short-petiolate, glabrous, serrate to almost entire.

The plant can be confused with Scutellaria (skullcap) and other members of the mint family.  Members of the mint family have square sided stems, and Veronica species have rounded stems.

Uses
American speedwell is used both as food and as a medicinal plant. It is rich in nutrients and is reported to have a flavor similar to that of watercress. As long as the water source is not contaminated, the entire plant (sans roots) can be eaten raw.

References

Further reading
 

americana
Edible plants
Flora of Asia
Flora of Subarctic America
Flora of Western Canada
Flora of Eastern Canada
Flora of the Northwestern United States
Flora of the North-Central United States
Flora of the Northeastern United States
Flora of the Southeastern United States
Flora of the South-Central United States
Flora of the Southwestern United States
Flora without expected TNC conservation status